Gallo is an Italian surname.

Geographical distribution
As of 2014, 36.1% of all known bearers of the surname Gallo were residents of Italy (frequency 1:680), 11.8% of Argentina (1:1,451), 11.7% of the United States (1:12,385), 7.1% of Colombia (1:2,691), 5.9% of the Philippines (1:6,855), 5.6% of Brazil (1:14,574), 3.0% of Mexico (1:16,388), 2.6% of Peru (1:4,966), 2.2% of Spain (1:8,604), 2.0% of Ecuador (1:3,181), 2.0% of France (1:13,504) and 1.0% of Uruguay (1:1,357).

In Italy, the frequency of the surname was higher than national average (1:680) in the following regions:
 1. Piedmont (1:207)
 2. Calabria (1:224)
 3. Campania (1:326)
 4. Liguria (1:491)
 5. Molise (1:650)

In Spain, the frequency of the surname was higher than national average (1:8,604) in the following autonomous communities:
 1. Cantabria (1:2,082)
 2. Basque Country (1:3,083)
 3. Castile and León (1:3,095)
 4. La Rioja (1:4,814)
 5. Asturias (1:5,193)
 6. Navarre (1:5,218)
 7. Community of Madrid (1:6,287)

In Argentina, the frequency of the surname was higher than national average (1:1,451) in the following provinces:
 1. Santiago del Estero Province (1:375)
 2. Córdoba Province (1:1,213)
 3. Buenos Aires Province (1:1,234)
 4. Santa Fe Province (1:1,238)
 5. Salta Province (1:1,254)
 6. La Pampa Province (1:1,262)
 7. Tucumán Province (1:1,263)

People
Agostino Gallo (1499–1570), Italian agronomist
American gangsters:
Albert Gallo, one of the "Gallo brothers"
Joe Gallo, one of the "Gallo brothers"
Joseph N. Gallo, consiglieri of the Gambino crime family
Anna Maria Gallo, better known as Mary Frances of the Five Wounds of Jesus, Italian saint
Andrea Gallo (1928–2013), Italian Roman Catholic priest
Anthony Gallo (born 1965), guitarist
Armando Gallo, Italian journalist and photographer
Bill Gallo, cartoonist and columnist for the New York Daily News
Carla Gallo, American actress
Dean Gallo, American congressman
Diego Gallo, Uruguayan swimmer
Domenico Gallo, Italian composer and violinist whose works are sometimes mistakenly attributed to Pergolesi.
E & J Gallo Winery, founded in 1933
Ernest Gallo, co-founder
Julio Gallo, co-founder
Joseph Edward Gallo, brother of Ernest and Julio Gallo
Inigo Gallo, Swiss actor and playwright
Fortune Gallo, impresario of the San Carlo Opera Company
George Gallo, American film producer
 Joey Gallo (baseball), MLB player
Mario Gallo, Italian born Argentine film director
Max Gallo, French author who wrote a series of novels based on the life of Napoleon I of France
Marielle Gallo, French Member of the European Parliament
Melissa Gallo, now uses the name Melissa Fumero
River Gallo, Salvadoran-American filmmaker and actor
Robert Gallo, retrovirus expert famous for his co-discovery of HIV, the virus that causes AIDS
Ron Gallo, American musician
Vincent Gallo, film director
Samuel Sarfati, physician to Pope Julius II, known as Gallo

Fictional characters:

Cordelia Gallo, a character in the Japanese light novel series Gosick
Cabe Gallo, a character from the American TV series Scorpion
Leland Gallo, a character from the American TV series Valor

References

Italian-language surnames
Spanish-language surnames